The Chicago Stakes is a Grade III American Thoroughbred horse race for fillies and mares, four years old and older over a distance of seven furlongs on the dirt track scheduled annually in June at run annually at Churchill Downs in Louisville, Kentucky. The event currently offers a purse of $200,000 plus a trophy.

History

The inaugural running of the event was on 31 August 1986, as the Chicago-Budweiser Breeders' Cup Handicap, the seventh event on the card for Budweiser-Arlington Million Day and was won by Lazer Show who was ridden by US Hall of Fame jockey Pat Day in a time of 1:21. Between 1986 and 1995 Budweiser sponsored the event and from 1986 and 2006 the Breeders' Cup sponsored the event which reflected in the name of the event. Lazer Show would win the event again the following year.

In 1992 the event was upgraded by the American Graded Stakes Committee of the Thoroughbred Owners and Breeders Association to Grade III status.

In 2007, the race was moved to a synthetic surface when Arlington Park switched its main track from dirt to an all-weather course. The Chicago Handicap was switched back to dirt in 2017, when it was moved to Churchill Downs in Louisville, Kentucky. Arlington Park was cutting back on its stakes races in order to boost overnight race purses, and Churchill Downs, which is owned by the same company, picked up both the Chicago Handicap and the Matron Stakes.

In 2018 the event returned back to Arlington Park with Princess La Quinta winning the race.

The event was not held in 1988, 1998, 1999 and 2015. In 2020 due to the COVID-19 pandemic in the United States, Arlington Park did not schedule the event in its shortened meeting.

In 2021 the event was scheduled as a stakes allowance event, hence the event was changed to the Chicago Stakes.

In 2022, the event was moved to Churchill Downs after the closure of Arlington Park in Arlington Heights, Illinois.
Also the conditions of the event were changed so that only mares four years old or older could enter.

Records 

Speed Record:  
 1:20.93  - Hotshot Anna (2018)

Margins: 
  lengths –  Safely Kept   (1991)

Most wins:
 2 - Lazer Show (1986, 1987)
 2 - Informed Decision (2009, 2010)
Most wins by an owner:
 2 - James J. Devaney (1986, 1987)
 2 - Edward P. Evans (1992, 1994)
 2 - Knob Hill Stable (2006, 2011) 
 2 - Augustin Stable (2009, 2010)

Most wins by a jockey:
 3 - Pat Day (1986, 1987, 1990)
 3 - Craig Perret (1991, 2001, 2003)
 3 - Rene R. Douglas (2002, 2004, 2008)
Most wins by a trainer:
 2 - Donald R. Winfree (1986, 1987)
 2 - Frank L. Brothers (1989, 2001)
 2 - D. Wayne Lukas (1992, 1995)
 2 - Phillip England (1996, 2000)
 2 - William I. Mott (2006, 2011)
 2 - Jonathan E. Sheppard (2009, 2010)
 2 - W. Bret Calhoun (2013, 2017)

Winners

Legend:

See also
List of American and Canadian Graded races

References

Graded stakes races in the United States
Horse races in Illinois
Sprint category horse races for fillies and mares
Arlington Park
Recurring sporting events established in 1986
1986 establishments in Illinois
Grade 3 stakes races in the United States